NVC Community  M27 (Filipendula ulmaria - Angelica sylvestris mire) is one of the 38 mire communities in the British National Vegetation Classification system.

Community Composition

The following species are found in this community

  Filipendula ulmaria
  Angelica sylvestris

References

 JNCC Report  No. 394  The European context of British Lowland Grasslands  J.S. Rodwell1, V. Morgan2, R.G. Jefferson3 & D. Moss 4 February 2007 JNCC, Peterborough 2007  jncc.defra.gov.uk

M27